The Later Chola dynasty ruled the Chola Empire from 1070 C.E. until the demise of the empire in 1279 C. E. This dynasty was the product of decades of alliances based on marriages between the Cholas and the Eastern Chalukyas based in Vengi, and produced some of the greatest Chola emperors such as Kulothunga Chola I (1070–1120 C. E.). Even though the later Cholas are often referred to as Chalukya Cholas, there were two breaks in the line. Kulothunga Chola II and Rajadhiraja Chola II did not belong to the Chalukya Chola line. Kulottunga II was a grandson of Vikrama Chola and Rajadhiraja Chola II was not the son of Rajaraja Chola II.

The extent of the Chola Empire during this period stretched from the island of Lanka to Kalinga in the northeast. The Empire also had active political and trade contacts with the maritime kingdoms of the Malay Archipelago and China.

Eastern and Western animosity

Towards the last quarter of tenth century C.E., the Deccan in South India was ruled by two Chalukya dynasties, the Western Chalukyas based in Kalyani and the Eastern Chalukyas based in Vengi near the coast of the Bay of Bengal.

The Eastern Chalukyan kingdom, founded by Kubja Vishnuvardhana, a brother of Pulakesin II, ruled the area between the Krishna River and the Venkata mountains north of Tondaimandalam from the 7th to the 11th century C.E.

Tailapa II, the Chlaukyan king who revived the Western Chalukayan power bringing about the fall of the Rashtrakuta power in Western Deccan in 973 C.E. The relations between the Western and the Eastern Chalukyan kingdoms were mostly antagonistic.

Cholas and Vengi

Cholas in the south of the Vengi kingdom became dominant around the beginning of the 10th century C.E. after having brought about fall of the Pallavas in Tondaimandalam. Rajaraja Chola, who is considered the greatest Chola ruler, ascended the throne of Tanjavur in 985 C.E. He pursued his imperialistic ambitions with an aggressive attitude. He conquered and consolidated the southern provinces and then in a mighty sweep in the north, brought Gangapadi, Nolambapadi, Talaikkadu and parts of southern Deccan under his rule. This Chola advance brought them into direct conflict with the Western Chalukyan power.

Rajaraja, the clever leader he was, thought that it was in the best interests of the Cholas to see that the Eastern Chalukyas did not make common cause with their cousins in the west, for such a coalition would constitute a challenge to the rising Chola power. He decided to befriend the weaker Eastern Chalukyas against the stronger Western Chalukyas and create the traditional sphere of balance of power in South India.

Rajaraja Chola took advantage of the situation when the sons of the Eastern Chalukya Danarnava, being deprived of their parental kingdom by Jata Choda Bhima, sought his help. He supported their cause and entered into matrimonial alliance with them. He gave his daughter Kundavai in marriage to Vimaladitya, the younger of the two princes.  This was the beginning of series of diplomatic marriages between these two dynasties.

Chola armies invaded Vengi kingdom twice and in the second attempt in 1002 – 1003 C.E., having slain Jata Choda Bhima in battle succeeded in establishing Darramava's elder son Saktivarman I firmly on the Vengi throne.

Consequences of the Alliance

This Eastern Chalukyan alliance with the Chola monarch had its far-reaching consequences. It deprived the rulers of Vengi much of their individuality and autonomy. Vengi ceased to be an independent kingdom and became a protectorate of the Chola empire.

The formation of the Chola-Chalukya alliance and the establishment of Chola ascendency over the entire coastal Telugu country upset the political equilibrium of the Southern Deccan and plunged the land into interminable dynastic wars. The Chalukyas of Kalyani challenged the Chola supremacy over the Telugu country, and Vengi became the theatre of a long war, which lasted, with few brief intervals, for the next 135 years.  The history of Vengi during this period is a history of this war; the Eastern Chalukyas, the rulers of the country recede into the background, leaving the Cholas and the Kalyani Chalukyas to dispute the field.

Chola-Western Chalukyan Wars

Invasion by Satyashraya

The first of the series of Western Chalukyan invasions which was to devastate Vengi during the next century and a quarter occurred during the early years of rule Saktivarman I (c. 1000 –1011 C.E.). Satyashraya (997 – 1008 C.E.), the son and successor of Tailapa II, sent an army led by one of his generals Baya Nambi to invade the Eastern Chalukyan kingdom in 1006 C.E. to overthrow the Chola-Chalukya alliance and bring the east coast under his control. The general entered Vengi from the south, reduced the forts of Dharanikota and Yanamadala to ashes and established himself at Chebrolu (Guntur district).

Rajaraja Chola distracted the attention of Satyashraya by sending his son Rajendra Chola I to invade Rattapadi in the west and thus compelled him to withdraw his army from Vengi for the defence of his realm. After the Western Chalukyan army retired from the east coast, Saktivarman was left in possession of his kingdom.

Succession disputes

At the close of the reign of Vimaladitya (1011 – 1018 C.E.) the succession to the Vengi throne was in dispute. His son Rajaraja Narendra, through the Chola princess Kundavai, was appointed crown prince and succeeded his father on the throne of Vengi. But Vijayaditya VII, who was the stepbrother of Rajaraja Narendra, seized power with the help of Jayasimha II, the Western Chalukyan ruler. Rajaraja Narendra naturally sought the help of his maternal uncle and overlord, the Chola emperor Rajendra Chola I. The latter promptly dispatched forces to his aid. Rajendra continued the tradition of fighting on two fronts in the north, which was started by Rajaraja Chola, as well. Rajendra Chola I sent a powerful army against Rattapadi to divert the attention of Jayasimha II and prevent him from sending effective help to Vijayaditya VII. With this, the king of Kalyani was compelled to take steps for the defence of his kingdom.

On the Eastern Chalukyan front, the Chola army led by the general Soliyavarasan defeated
Vijayaditya and his Kalinga and Odda supporters in several battles, took possession of the country on behalf of Rajaraja Narendra and proceeded afterwards on a grand military expedition to the Gangetic valley. To protect the rear of his army campaigning in the Gangetic valley, Rajendra Chola I had his sojourn on the banks of the Godavari, during which he enthroned
his nephew Rajaraja Narendra as the ruler of Vengi and celebrated the latter's coronation on 16 August 1022 A.D. He then gave his daughter Ammangai in marriage to his nephew who had by her a son Rajendra named after him.

Difficulties of Rajendra Narendra

Rajaraja Narendra was constantly beset with difficulties during his long rule of 41 years. His half-brother Vijayaditya never gave up his designs upon the throne. He managed to oust his brother, seize the throne and keep himself in power, probably with the help from the Western Chalukya court between 1031 and 1035 C.E.

Around, 1042 C.E. the new ruler of Kalyani, Ahavamalla Someshvara I, with whom Vijayaditya VII allied himself, sent an expedition against Vengi.  Rajendra Chola I sent Chola forces to Vengi under his general Rajaraja Brahmamaharaja. A bloody battle took place at Kalidindi in the West Godavari district. The result of the battle was indecisive. A lull prevailed in the warfare after this battle.

Rajadhiraja and Someshvara I

Rajadhiraja Chola I (1042 – 1052 C.E.), the son and successor of Rajendra Chola I, in his eagerness to restore the Chola hegemony over Vengi to its former absolute state, led an expedition into the Vengi country in 1044 – 1045 C.E. He fought a battle at Dhannada and compelled the Western Chalukyan army along with Vijayaditya VII to retreat in disorder. He then entered into the Western Chalukyan dominions and set fire to the Kollipaka fort on the frontier between the Kalyani and Vengi territories.

This brought relief for Rajaraja Narendra who was now firmly in control at Vengi, with Rajadhiraja Chola I proceeding all the way up to the Chalukyan capital, displacing the Chalukyan king Someshvara I and performing his coronation at Manyakheta and collecting tribute from the defeated king, who had fled the battlefield. However, while the Chalukyans kept creating trouble through Vijayaditya VII Vengi remained firmly in control of the Cholas. Someshvara I however, again launched an attack on Vengi and then the Cholas around 1054. While he had initial success when Rajadhiraja Chola I was killed in the battle at Koppal, in the same battle however, Rajadhiraja's younger brother Rajendra Chola II immediately took over command, announced himself as the next Chola emperor and galvanized the Chola army, crushing the Chalukyas under Someshvara I in the process.  Again, the Chalukya king fled the battle field leaving his queen and riches behind in the possession of the victorious Chola army.<*> The Cholas consolidated their hold on both Vengi and Kalinga, though from time to time there indeed were skirmishes with the Chalukyas with the enemies being crushed repeatedly by both the Cholas and the Vengi princes, who openly professed loyalty and allegiance to the Chola empire.  To the credit of the Cholas, their main interest in Vengi was because of the marital alliance with that Kingdom from the times of Raja Raja Chola I and Rajendra Chola I. There was no other territorial ambition, rather only using Vengi as a path to access Kalinga and Vangalanadu (Bengal). They held the territory almost up to 1094 when the Chalukya king Vikramaditya VI tried to attack both Vengi and Kanchi but his army was beaten back by the Cholas under Kulothunga Chola I who chased them up to Gangavadi<*>.

Successors of Rajaraja Narendra

The death of Rajaraja Narendra in 1061 C.E. offered another opportunity to the Kalyani court to strengthen its hold on Vengi. Vijayaditya VII seized Vengi and with the consent of his suzerain of Kalyani whom he had served loyally for several years, established himself permanently in the kingdom. Meanwhile, prince Rajendra Chalukya, son of Rajaraja Narendra through the Chola princess Ammangai was brought up in the Chola harem.

Rajendra Chalukya, also known as Rajendra Chola, married Madhurantakidevi, the daughter of the new Chola ruler Rajendra Chola II (1054 A.D. —1063 A.D.), the brother and successor of Rajadhiraja I. In order to restore him on the Vengi throne, the Rajendra Chola II sent his son Rajamahendra and brother Virarajendra Chola against the Western Chalukyas and Vijayaditya VII.

The Chola forces marched against Gangavadi and drove away the Chalukyas. Virarajendra then marched against Vengi and probably killed Saktivarman II, son of Vijayaditya VII.

Meanwhile, Rajendra II died and as his son Rajamahendra had predeceased him, his brother Virarajendra Chola went back to Gangaikonda Cholapuram and was crowned the Chola king. Fortunes fluctuated for the Eastern Chalukya Rajendra Choda during this period. For sometime he was found ruling in Chakrakuta, while his uncle Vijayaditya VII was allowed to rule Vengi.

Vikramaditya VI

On the death of Someshvara I in 1068 C.E., Vikramaditya VI, one of his three sons, began to pursue his plans for securing the throne of Kalyani for himself. Accordingly, he first got Vijayaditya to make his submission to Virarajendra Chola and make peace with him and soon after followed the same course himself. Virarajendra even gave his daughter in marriage to Vikramaditya VI.

Kulothunga's accession

When Virarajendra died and his son and successor Adhirajendra was assassinated a few months later in 1070 C.E in the Chola capital The Chola dynasty was without a lineal successor in the Vijayalaya Chola line.

For three generations the Eastern Chalukyan princes had married in to the imperial Chola family and they came to feel that they belonged as much to the Chola family as to the Eastern Chalukyan. Further Rajendra Chalukya of Vengi, according to Kalingaltuparani, an epic written in praise of Kulothunga's invasion of Kalinga,  'spent his childhood days in Gangaikonda Cholapuram and was a familiar favourite to the princes and the people of the Chola country'. It is under these circumstances, Rajendra Chalukya moved into the 'Political vacuum created by the death of Adhirajendra' and established himself on the Chola throne as Kulothunga Chola I.  Since then Kulottunga I and his descendants came to be known as the Chalukya-Cholas in history.

Kulothunga I reconciled himself with his uncle Vijayaditya VII and allowed him to rule Vengi during the remaining years of his life. With Vijayaditya's death in 1075 C.E., the Eastern Chalukyan line came to an end. Vengi became a province of the Chola Empire. Kulottunga Chola I administered the province through his sons by sending them as Viceroys. However, there was a prolonged fight between him and Vikramaditya VI.

Beginnings of the decline

Kulothunga Chola I was an able monarch and for the most part ruled over a vast empire. He ascended the Chola throne at a time when the Chola Empire was under mortal danger from internal as well as external troubles. Kulothunga established himself on the Chola throne soon overcoming the threats to the Chola Empire and had a long reign characterised by unparalleled success and prosperity. He avoided unnecessary wars and earned the true admiration of his subjects. His successes resulted in the wellbeing of the empire for the next 100 years.

However the first seeds of the impending troubles were sown in his reign and the downhill roll towards the ultimate demise of this great empire was begun. Kulothunga lost the territories in the island of Lanka and more seriously, the Pandya territories were beginning to slip away from Chola control.

Diminished empire

The setbacks suffered during the final years of Kulothunga I left a somewhat diminished empire, though still as strong and influential as before. Kulothunga's successors Vikrama Chola (1118–1135 C. E.) and Kulothunga Chola II (1133–1150 C. E.) were capable and compassionate leaders who took care not to involve their subjects in unnecessary and unwinnable wars.

Rajaraja Chola II (1146–1173 C. E.), Rajadhiraja Chola II (1166–1178 C. E.) and Kulothunga Chola III (1178–1218 C. E.) took active roles in the politics of the emerging revival of the Pandyas. Meanwhile, the Chola succession was getting murkier and murkier with disputes and intrigues during the periods of Rajadhiraja II and Kulothunga III.

Defeat against Pandyas
Maravarman Sundara Pandyan exposed the hollowness of the Chola power when he invaded the Chola kingdom under Kulothunga Chola III. Cholas finally lost all pretence of control in the Pandya territories. For the first time in many generations, the Chola capitals were sacked by the enemy and the Chola king reduced to the state of a wandering refugee. He survived and managed to hold on to his throne with the help of the Hoysala Ballala III.

Revolts

This was the signal the Chola feudatories and the overgrown vassals were waiting for in order to declare their independence. At the earliest opportunity that arose, they transferred their allegiance to either of the growing powers. Rajaraja Chola III came to power at this stage. His reign was characterised by growing revolt and conflicts even in nominally Chola territories. He broke the treaty with the Pandyas and received an invasion by the Pandyas in return.

The meteoric rise of the Kadava chieftain Kopperunchinga I also played a part in this war. Kopperunchinga imprisoned Rajaraja. Hoysalas again intervened and compelled Kopperunchinga to release the Chola king. Again the Cholas managed to survive with Hoysala help.

Final fall

The intervention of the Hoysalas managed to provide the Cholas with a longer lease of life. Rajaraja Chola III ruled from 1216 to 1246 C. E. Rajendra Chola III, a rival claimant to the throne, was a much more able ruler than his predecessor. Inscriptions of Rajendra III indicate a civil war between him and Rajaraja III which came to end by the former killing the latter. Rajendra III managed to hold the kingdom together, but toward the end of his reign, the Cholas lost the control of Kanchipuram which was occupied by the Telugu Cholas of Nellore.  Cholas also lost a crucial ally when differences arose between them and the Hoysalas. When the Pandya Jatavarman Sundara Pandyan I (1251–1268 C. E.) moved north in 1264 CE. the Hoysalas did not offer any help. The Pandya army sacked the Chola capital of Gangaikonda Cholapuram. The Chola territories then came under the total control of Pandyas in 1279.

See also

 Chalukyas
 Cholas

References 

 Durga Prasad, History of the Andhras up to 1565 A. D., P. G. PUBLISHERS
 Nilakanta Sastri, K.A. (1935). The CōĻas, University of Madras, Madras (Reprinted 1984).
 Nilakanta Sastri, K.A. (1955). A History of South India, OUP, New Delhi .
 South Indian Inscriptions 

Dynasties of India
Empires and kingdoms of India
Chola dynasty
Raju
States and territories established in 1070
History of Tiruchirappalli